Ongley may refer to:

Arthur Ongley (1882–1974), New Zealand lawyer, and cricket and Rugby union player and administrator
Baron Ongley, a title in the Peerage of Ireland held by three individuals, created in 1776 and became extinct in 1877
Esther Ongley, New Zealand lawyer.
Joe Ongley (1918–2000), New Zealand cricketer and judge
Marc Ongley (born 1952), Australian classical and jazz guitarist, composer, and teacher, living in the United Kingdom
Mont Ongley (1888–1976), New Zealand geologist and scientific administrator
Samuel Ongley (disambiguation)